Farnesyl pyrophosphate (FPP), also known as farnesyl diphosphate (FDP), is an intermediate in the biosynthesis of terpenes and terpenoids such as sterols and carotenoids. It is also used in the synthesis of CoQ (part of the electron transport chain), as well as dehydrodolichol diphosphate (a precursor of dolichol, which transports proteins to the ER lumen for N-glycosylation).

Biosynthesis
Farnesyl pyrophosphate synthase (a prenyl transferase) catalyzes sequential condensation reactions of dimethylallyl pyrophosphate with 2 units of 3-isopentenyl pyrophosphate to form farnesyl pyrophosphate, as is shown in the following two steps:

 Dimethylallyl pyrophosphate reacts with 3-isopentenyl pyrophosphate to form geranyl pyrophosphate:

 Geranyl pyrophosphate then reacts with another molecule of 3-isopentenyl pyrophosphate to form farnesyl pyrophosphate

Pharmacology
The above reactions are inhibited by bisphosphonates (used for osteoporosis). Farnesyl pyrophosphate is a selective agonist of TRPV3.

Related compounds
Farnesene
Farnesol
Geranyl pyrophosphate
Geranylgeranyl pyrophosphate

References 

Organophosphates
Sesquiterpenes